The 2022 MLS Re-Entry Draft was conducted in two stages, as it has been in previous years. Stage 1 took place on November 17, 2022, and Stage 2 took place on November 22, 2022. All 28 existing Major League Soccer club and its newest expansion club St. Louis City SC took place in the 2022 MLS Re-Entry Draft. The draft order was set in reverse order of the 2022 Major League Soccer season standing after completion of the 2022 MLS Cup Playoffs. Because St. Louis City SC did not participate in the 2022 MLS season, they would have the last position in the 2022 MLS Re-Entry Draft. Teams have the option to decline a selection throughout the draft.

If a club chooses a player in stage 1 of the Re-Entry draft, that club must either exercise an option for that player or extend them a Bona Fide offer. Clubs may not select any player from their own club who are eligible to be part of the Re-Entry draft. If a player is selected in the Re-Entry draft, and they have a current option on their contract, they will be automatically added to the drafting club's roster. If a club makes a Bona Fide Offer, and the selected player rejects the offer, the drafting club maintains the Right to First Refusal for that player in Major League Soccer.

Any player not selected by a team in Stage 1 of the Re-Entry draft are available in Stage 2, unless the player requests to opt-out through a written that they submit to the league. If a club selects a player in Stage 2 they have seven days to make an offer to the player. If the club and player cannot reach an agreement, the club retains the Right to First Refusal in Major League Soccer. Just as with Stage 1, clubs may not select their own players in Stage 2.

Stage One

Stage Two
The second stage of the 2022 MLS Re-Entry Draft took place on Tuesday, November 22, 2022.

After the Second Stage concluded, teams were allowed to select players who were on their own roster in 2022.

Round 2

References

Major League Soccer drafts
MlS Re-entry Draft, 2022
MLS Re-Entry Draft